Kayra Nelemans (born 11 October 2002) is a Dutch footballer who plays as defender for ADO Den Haag in the Eredivisie.

Club career

International career

Personal life
Nelemans was born in Vlaardingen.

Honours

Club

International

References

Living people
Dutch women's footballers
Eredivisie (women) players
2002 births
Women's association football defenders
ADO Den Haag (women) players
People from Vlaardingen